Sigismondi is a surname. Notable people with the surname include: 

Floria Sigismondi (born 1965), Italian-Canadian film director, screenwriter, artist, and photographer
Pietro Sigismondi (1908–1967), Italian Catholic prelate and diplomat

Italian-language surnames
Patronymic surnames
Surnames from given names